Electromagnetic weapon may refer to:

 Electromagnetic pulse (EMP), a natural or man-made transient electromagnetic disturbance
 Directed-energy weapon (DEW), a ranged weapon system that emits highly focused energy

See also
 Electroshock weapon, a less-lethal weapon that utilizes an electric shock to incapacitate a target
 Magnetic weapon, one that uses magnetic fields to accelerate or stop projectiles, or to focus charged particle beams